Vegetable oil refining may refer to:

 Fat hydrogenation, combining vegetable oil with hydrogen to make it more saturated
 Edible oil refining, process to refin a raw oil to produce an edible oil, which differ from Olive oil production.
 Biodiesel production by transesterification
 Production of hydrotreated vegetable oil, a biofuel